Lee Ga-sub (Hangul: 이가섭; born December 28, 1991) is a South Korean actor.

Filmography

Film

Television series

Awards and nominations

References

External links
 

1991 births
Living people
People from Busan
South Korean male stage actors
21st-century South Korean male actors
Sejong University alumni